Roger Édouard Louis Marie Joseph Ghislain Moeremans d'Emaüs (12 June 1890 – 19 March 1975) was a Belgian horse rider and rowing coxswain who competed in the 1920 Summer Olympics.

In 1920 he and his horse Sweet Girl won the bronze medal in the team eventing, after finishing fourth in the individual eventing competition. They also participated in the individual jumping event and finished seventh.

References

External links 
 profile

1890 births
1975 deaths
Belgian male equestrians
Belgian show jumping riders
Event riders
Olympic equestrians of Belgium
Equestrians at the 1920 Summer Olympics
Olympic bronze medalists for Belgium
Olympic medalists in equestrian
Medalists at the 1920 Summer Olympics
Belgian male rowers
Coxswains (rowing)
20th-century Belgian people